The Corowa Football Club, nicknamed the Spiders, was an Australian rules football club based in Corowa, New South Wales, that competed in the Ovens & Murray Football League.

The club merged with the Wahgunyah Football Club on several occasions during its early history and as a result was also known as the Border United Football Club from time to time between 1877 and 1947.

Then in 1979, both Corowa Football Club and Rutherglen Football Club merged to form Corowa Rutherglen Football Club and have played in the Ovens and Murray Football League ever since.

Club history

The Corowa Football club was established by a gentleman called Jacob Levin in 1877. Wahgunyah Football Club soon followed and the first recorded match of the Corowa Football Club was a return match against Wahgunyah Football Club on Saturday, 16 June 1877, played "on the hill" in Corowa, with Wahgunyah winning the first encounter.

As early as 1877, there was talk of the Wahgunyah and Corowa Football merging to form one stronger club and be called Border United Football Club. This merger actually took place and their first match as Border United was played against the Rutherglen Football Club in August 1877 and was captained by Jacob Levin. The Border United team wore pink and white colours.

In 1879, a North East Victorian district football team was compiled to play the Melbourne Football Club in Melbourne on 25 September 1879. Border United players selected in this squad were J Chivell, J Levin and A McLaughlin, resulting in a win to Melbourne.

In 1880, in a match played on the Corowa ground to decide the "unofficial" premiership of the North East District, Border United: 7.14 – 56 defeated Beechworth: 2.1 – 13. Jacob Levin captained the Border side.

In 1884, 20 acres of land along the Murray River near the main bridge across from Wahgunyah was set aside by the NSW Department of Lands as a recreational reserve in Corowa. Regulations were written up in 1911 with the reserve under the management of a group of locally elected trustees.

In 1884, the Corowa Junior footballers travelled to Albury, but were defeated in a close match.

In July 1887, Border United FC hosted the Essendon Football Club in Corowa, with about 1000 people present, with Essendon, 4.14 – 38 defeating Corowa 3.5 – 23. James Nugent was captain of the Border United FC side.

Border United FC was a very settled club between 1877 and 1905, with annual general meetings and club office bearers reported in the Corowa Free Press newspaper every year. They played many friendly matches against other local towns and teams, prior to entering the O&MFA in 1895.

In 1890, Border United FC had a first 20 side and a second 20 side that played in a number of friendly matches against other local teams.

The Border United Football Club first entered the Ovens and Murray Football League in 1895 and finished third on the ladder. Border United FC remained in the O&MFA between 1895 and 1905.

In 1896, William King – Border United FC was arrested and charged with assaulting umpire Tidyman, cutting his face in a match against Chiltern Football Club. King was fined £3, plus £8 in legal fees in the Corowa Police Court, in default of six months imprisonment. The fine was paid for by several local residents. The Ovens and Murray Football League later disqualified King for life.

In 1897, the Border United and Corowa Federal Junior Football Club's merged after a number of last year's players had left the district.

In 1899, the small town of Corowa boasted four football teams – Border United, Half – Holidays, Pilots and Pirates, as well as Wahgungah across the river.

In 1900 Border United played off for the O&MFA premiership against Excelsior in Rutherglen after both finishing the season on equal points, but lost the match by 10 points, thus finishing as runners up.

In 1902, 1903 and 1904, Border United finished second on the O&MFA ladder at the end of the home and away season. No finals were played in these seasons. In 1905, Border United failed to win a game in the O&MFA. So in early 1906 the Border United FC changed its name to the Corowa Football Club after much discussion at the club's AGM.

At the Border United FC's Annual General Meeting at the O'Leary's Courthouse Hotel on Wednesday, 13 April 1904 and "owing to the apathy shown last year and so far as the present season has gone it was decided to disband the club."

Then on Tuesday, 19 April 1904, a meeting was held at Kelly's Corowa Hotel, it was resolved to re-form and once again enter the O&MFA, with the nominations and elections of the club's office bearers taking place.

In 1904, the Trustees of the Corowa Recreation Reserve co-signed the "Regulations for the management of the recreation ground at Corowa".

At an Ovens and Murray Football Association meeting in Rutherglen on Wednesday, 5 July 1905, the President stated that "the Border United side had disbanded for the remainder of the season", resulting in a winless season.

In 1906 the Corowa and District Football Association was formed and the following teams entered this competition – Balldale, Burryjaa, Corowa, Howlong and Wahgunyah. Corowa Football Club went onto win the premiership, finishing on top of the ladder, with seven wins from eight games.

In 1906, Corowa FC captain, Fred Nixon left Corowa for financial reasons to go and play with the Rutherglen FC.

In 1907, Corowa finishing fourth on the ladder in the Corowa and District Football Association, which was won by the Wahgunyah Football Club.

At the Annual General Meeting of the Border United Football Club in Corowa on Tuesday, 20 May 1908 at the Corowa Hotel, it was decided to change the club's name to the Corowa Football Club after the Wahgunyah Football Club informed them that wanted to run a team by themselves. Both clubs played in the Ovens and Murray Football League in 1908.

In 1909, Corowa once again played in the O&MFL, but in 1910 Corowa FC went into recess as a club. One newspaper article wrote due to "the introduction of professionalism in different teams......it absolutely killed football in Corowa......a number of players now appear to play for whichever club is offering the highest price". Wahgunyah FC played in the O&MFL Junior competition in 1910 and were runners up to Lake Moodermere.

In 1911, the Corowa FC were reformed after a meeting at Jager's Royal Hotel on Tuesday, 4 April and decided to continue to play in the red and black colours as in previous years. They then entered the Rutherglen and District Football Association and played as Corowa FC in 1911 and 1912.

In September 1911, Chas Flowers won a gold medal for winning the Corowa Free Press goalkicking competition.

In 1913, the club changed its name to and was referred to as the Border United Football Club in the local newspaper, The Corowa Free Press. The club lost the Preliminary Final to Rutherglen by five points.

In the 1914 O&MFA Grand Final Rutherglen: 9.9 – 63 defeated Border United: 6.16 – 52 on the Albury Sportsground.

In September 1914, North Melbourne Football Club defeated Border United on the Corowa Recreation Reserve.

In 1918, Border United FC played in the Rutherglen & Murray Football Association consisting of the following sides: Border United, Freehold Ramblers and Lake Rovers, with all funds raised going to the Patriotic Fund. Lake Rovers defeated the Freehold Ramblers in the grand final at Barkly Park Oval, Rutherglen.

In 1919, Border United returned to the O&MFA and wore a red guernsey with black hoops.

When the O&MFA went into recess in 1920, Corowa FC entered the Coreen & District Football Association and competed with – Balldale, Burraja, Coreen, Daysdale and Oakslands. Corowa took out the 1920 premiership, defeating Daysdale in the grand final played at Burraja.

In 1921 Corowa FC returned to the O&MFA and were defeated by St. Patrick's FC in the grand final played at the Albury Showgrounds.

In 1924, Corowa FC appointed former St. Kilda Football Club player, Rex De Garis as playing coach and wore a red jumper with two black vertical stripes on the front of the jumper.

In 1926, Frank Huggard was initially appointed, but Maurie Sheahan  ended up as the official coach in 1926.

In March 1926, the Corowa Stars Football Club was established to foster young football talent in the town and provide coaching to a team of juniors, who from time to time could fill in for Corowa's O&MFA club. The Corowa Stars initially applied to enter the Coreen & District Football League, but their entry was rejected. Corowa Stars were later accepted into the Chiltern & District Football Association in 1926. The Corowa Stars went onto win the 1927 Chiltern & DFL premiership when they defeated Wodonga Rovers on the Chiltern Football Ground and were captained by Jack Kuschert. Corowa Stars played in the Corowa & District FA from 1930 to 1933. Corowa Stars decided to reform after their 1934 – AGM, but it appears they never got up and going and did not enter a team in any local competition and ultimately folded.

In 1926, the Corowa Recreation Reserve hosted the O&MFA grand final when St. Patrick's FC defeated Wangaratta Football Club.

In an interesting move at the conclusion of the 1926 O&MFL season for Corowa FC, coach Maurie Sheahan accepted the coaching job at Walbundrie Football Club for the remainder of the 1926 season.

In 1929, the O&MFA selected Corowa as the venue to host the grand final, when East Albury defeated West Albury.

One of the local Corowa FC stars of the 1920s was forward, Newman Bufford who apparently was "the greatest forward the Murray ever knew. The man Maurie Hunter takes his hat off to."

In 1930, Corowa appointed former St. Kilda Football Club player, Bert Smedley as playing coach.

In 1932, Corowa, captained by Ray "Nana" Baker defeated West Albury Football Club in the Ovens and Murray Football League grand final on the Albury Sportsground.

After the 1932 premiership, Corowa played off for the unofficial championships of North Eastern Victoria against the 1932 Ovens & King Football League premiers, Wangaratta Football Club in Corowa on Saturday, 1 October. Wangaratta defeated Corowa by 12 points.

In 1934, coached by Ray Le Peyre, Corowa were runners up, remarkably to a team called the Border United FC (a 1933 merger club between East Albury & Weir United) in the O&MFA Grand Final, played on the Albury Sportsground.  In 1936, Border United FC would merge with the Albury Football Club when both clubs were short of players and both in debt and took on the name of Albury Football Club.

In 1936, Corowa played with a newly designed jumper, which was all black with a red V across the front and a white number on the rear, which was adopted at the club's AGM.

In 1936, Corowa Recreation Reserve hosted the O&MFL grand final in which Wangaratta Football Club defeated Rutherglen Football Club.

In 1937, former Richmond and Footscray player, Rupert Gibb was appointed as coach.

In 1938 the Corowa Rovers Football Club was formed and entered the Chiltern & District Football League. In 1939 they were captained by Frank "Gunboat" Smith and lost the grand final to the Howlong Football Club. Unfortunately the club disbanded in early 1940 due to World War II, with many young local players joining the military.

In 1939, Corowa FC did not record a win for the season, losing 15 consecutive matches.

In 1941, Len Woods, a 1940 recruit from Rennie Football Club, did pre-season training with South Melbourne Football Club.

In 1941 there appears to be no official Corowa FC meetings held or friendly matches reported in the local paper, the Corowa Free Press.

But in 1942, a local Corowa Military Football Association competition was set up between the "Corowa Town" FC (mainly local Corowa FC players) and the Royal Australian Air Force (RAAF) and the Australian Imperial Force (AIF), whose teams were made up of many interstate soldiers based in Corowa, with the RAAF defeating Corowa Town in the grand final, played on the Corowa Recreation Reserve.

In 1943, Corowa FC footballers played a number of friendly matches against other local nearby towns under the banner of both the Royal Hotel and Star Hotel, Corowa, using the names Corowa Royals FC and also the Corowa Stars FC, to raise much-needed funds for the local Prisoner of War Appeal and they played for the "Corowa Hostelry Premiership", with the Royals winning by two points.

In 1944, the Border United FC was reformed and they entered the Murray Valley Patriotic Football League, with all funds going to charity. Border United finished runner up to Tungamah Football Club in 1944 and were runners up to Wangaratta Football Club in 1945.

Border United FC played in the O&MFL in 1946 and 1947, with Keith Williams, winning the 1947 O&MFL Morris Medal, prior to heading down to play with Fitzroy Football Club in 1948.

In November 1946, former Richmond Football Club premiership player, Leo Merrett was initially appointed as coach for the 1947 season, but was refused a clearance. The club then appointed former Fitzroy Football Club premiership player, Ken Sier, but his clearance was also refused. The club finally has success with a VFL clearance and appointed former 1944 Fitzroy Football Club premiership player, Stan Wright as captain / coach for the 1947 season. Wright, after injuring his knee in round one, returned in round six against Yarrawonga Football Club, but "his knee could not stand the strain" and he resigned.  Border United officials then signed up South Melbourne Football Club player, Tom Roulent as coach, but his clearance was also refused. Former local player Ray "Nana" Baker then took over as coach for the remainder of the season.

In 1947, South Corowa Football Club was formed and entered a team in the Coreen & District Football League and were coached by former, Fitzroy and North Melbourne player, Neville Huggins and played their home games at the Corowa Racecourse. In 1949, South Corowa lost the grand final by four points to Wahgunyah Football Club at Coreen and were coached by W. Chisnall.

In 1947, the Wahgunyah Football Club reformed after World War II and joined the Coreen & District Football League.

Border United lost the 1947 O&MFL Preliminary Final to Benalla at Rutherglen, after being in front at half time.

At the Annual General Meeting of the Border United Football Club in Corowa on Thursday, 5 February 1948 it was moved that the club be dissolved and the Corowa Football Club be formed and all assets and liabilities and all its rights and privileges be assumed by the Corowa Football Club.

In early 1949, Corowa FC established a reserves football team, known as the Corowa Stars Football Club and entered the Chiltern & District Football League. They wore a black football jumper, with a red star on the front.

In 1949, Denis "Dinny" Carroll trained with the Essendon Football Club during their pre-season.

On Saturday, 1 October 1949, Corowa FC / O&MFL hosted the Essendon Football Club in a friendly match on the Corowa Recreation Reserve, with Essendon winning a close match against the O&MFL.

In 1950, Bill King coached both Corowa FC (O&MFL) and Corowa Stars FC (Chiltern & DFL).

In July 1950, Ken Hansen played in the New South Wales state team on the half back line at the national football carnival held in Brisbane, Queensland.

In September 1950, Corowa hosted Camberwell Football Club in a match at the Corowa Recreation Reserve.

In round 16, 1951 a young Rennie Football Club player, Jim Sandral made his Ovens and Murray Football League debut (on a permit from the Coreen & District Football League) for Corowa FC against Wangaratta Football Club, on the Wangaratta Showgrounds and made "an impressive debut". Sandral also played on permit against Wangaratta Rovers Football Club in round two, 1954, before playing a full season with Corowa in 1955 then playing in Melbourne Football Club's 1956 VFL Grand Final premiership, before returning as Corowa's Captain / Coach in 1958 and 1959.

In 1952, the Corowa Stars FC (Corowa Reserves) won the premiership in the Chiltern & District Football League against Chiltern Football Club played in Wodonga and were coached by Fred Webb, a former captain of Sandringham Football Club.

At the 1953 Chiltern & District Football League – AGM, the Corowa Star FC successfully applied for a clearance to Ovens and Murray Football League to play in the newly formed O&MFL Reserves competition.

In 1953, Corowa player, Brian Crisfield trained with the Melbourne Football Club during their pre-season after Corowa coach, Tom Lahiff recommended Crisfield to Melbourne.

In 1953, Corowa reserves side won the O&MFL Reserve grade football premiership, defeating Albury Football Club and were coached by Jack Bartlett.

In 1954, former Tasmanian, Bill Byrne was appointed coach.

Two Corowa players, Keith Schmidt and Leo Farrell trained with the Collingwood Football Club during the  1954 pre-season and apparently showed some promising form.

In 1954, William Dicks with 17 votes, was runner up to Benalla's Kevin Hurley, on 19 votes in the O&MFL Morris Medal.

In April 1957, Corowa South FC withdrew from the Coreen & District Football League and subsequently folded.

In 1965, Corowa appointed former Footscray player, John Hoiles as captain/coach.

In 1968 former Richmond Football Club player, Fred Swift coached Corowa to a premiership against Wodonga Football Club.

In 1973, Corowa FC entered a "Thirds" team in the new Ovens and Murray Football League Under 18 competition.

The club merged with the Rutherglen FC in 1979, forming the Corowa-Rutherglen Football Club.

Football leagues

Corowa FC and / or Border United FC have played in the following football competitions since 1895.

 Ovens & Murray Football League
 1895–1905 (Border United FC)
 Corowa and District Football Association
 1906 and 1907 (Corowa FC)
 Ovens & Murray Football League
 1908 and 1909 (Corowa FC)
 Rutherglen & District Football Association
 1911 to 1912 (Corowa FC)
 Ovens & Murray Football League
 1913 to 1915, (Border United FC)
 World War I (O&MFA / Club in recess)
 1916, 1917 & 1918
 Rutherglen & Murray Football Association
 1918 (Border United FC)
 Ovens & Murray Football League
 1919 (Border United FC)
 Coreen & District Football League
 1920 (Corowa FC)
 Ovens & Murray Football League
 1921 to 1940 (Corowa FC)
 World War II (O&MFA / Club in recess)
 1941 to 1945.
 Corowa Military Football Association
 1942 (Corowa Town FC)
 Murray Valley Patriotic Football League
 1944 & 1945 (Border United FC)
 Ovens & Murray Football League
 1946 & 1947 (Border United FC)
 Ovens & Murray Football League
 1948 to 1978 (Corowa FC)
 Chiltern & District Football Association
 1949 to 1952 (Corowa Stars FC) – Corowa FC Reserves/2nd 18
 Ovens & Murray Football League
 1979 to 2020 (Corowa / Rutherglen FNC)

(Merged with Rutherglen Redlegs and formed Corowa-Rutherglen Roos in 1979; additionally surplus players formed the Rutherglen-Corowa Cats in 1979).

Football premierships
 North East Region (unofficial premiers)
 1880, 1889
 Corowa & District Football Association
 1906
 Coreen & District Football League
 1920
 Chiltern & District Football Association
 1927 Corowa Stars FC – (Corowa FC Reserves / 2nd 18)
 Leeton Football Club – Knockout Competition
 1946 (Border United FC), 1948
 Corowa & District Football Knockout Competition – "VFL Cup"
 1949
 Chiltern & District Football Association
 1952 Corowa Stars FC – (Corowa FC Reserves / 2nd 18)
 Ovens & Murray Football League
 Seniors: (2) 1932, 1968
 Reserves: (1) 1953

Runners up
 Ovens & Murray Football League
Seniors: 
Border United: 1900, 1902, 1903, 1904, 1914. 
Corowa: 1921, 1934, 1963

Reserves: 1973

Murray Valley Patriotic Football League
 Seniors: Border United: 
1944, 1945

Team of the Century

Team reference
  Border United (1877 - 1905, 1914 - 1919, 1944 - 1947)
  Corowa (1906 - 1913, 1920 to 1943, 1948 - 78)
  Rutherglen (1903–78)
  Corowa-Rutherglen (1979–2003)

Notes
 1 George Tobias played mainly with the Corowa FC. He was also a foundation player for the Corowa-Rutherglen FC in 1979
 2 Dinny Carroll also played with the Border United FC in 1947.
 3 W Chic O'Donoghue also played with the Border United FC in 1946 and 1947.
 4 Mark Mills played with Corowa FC and Corowa / Rutherglen FC.
 5 Lou Jackson played mainly with Rutherglen FC, but also played with Border United FC in 1900 and with Lake Rovers in 1911.

Ovens and Murray Football League – Best and Fairest winners 
O&MFL – Senior Football – Morris Medal winners
1947. Keith Williams (with Border United FC)
1959. Jim Sandral
1962. Jim Sandral
1964. Jim Sandral
1965. Alby Dunn
1970. John Clancy
1971. John Clancy
1974. Alan Way
1978. Mark Mills
O&MFL – Reserves Football (The Ralph Marks Medal – 1953 to 1970)
1954. Ernie Aiken – Was the equal winner of this award, but lost on a count back & has never received a retrospective medal like others have in the Morris Medal!
1955. Jack Rippingale
1961. John Dormer
1962. Mick Seymour
1964. Kerry Seymour
1966. Mick Seymour
O&MFL – Thirds Football 
1978. John Clohessy

Ovens and Murray Football League – Hall of Fame inductees
 2005 – Jim Sandral
 2009 – John Clancy
 2009 - Denis Sandral
 2013 – Jim Sandral – Upgraded to "Legend" status

Corowa FC players who played in the VFL
The following players played football with Corowa, prior to playing senior football in the VFL, with the year indicating their VFL debut.

 1900 – Charlie Roland – Carlton. Charlie Roland played with the Border United FC between 1894 and 1898.
 1903 – Fred Nixon – St. Kilda
 1920 – Greg Stockdale – Essendon
 1924 – Alby Anderson – St. Kilda & Richmond
 1929 – Frank Whitty – Hawthorn
 1932 – John Connell – St. Kilda. Connell played with the Corowa Stars FC in 1930.
 1937 – Vic Carroll – Fitzroy
 1948 – Keith Williams – Fitzroy. Williams played with Border United FC in 1945, 46 & 47.
 1956 – Jim Sandral – Melbourne
 1957 – Bill Byrne – Melbourne
 1963 – Max Urquhart – Collingwood
 1964 – Robert Longmire – Collingwood
 1966 – Greg Lambert – South Melbourne
 1968 – Peter Chisnall – North Melbourne
 1968 – George McInnes – Richmond
 1969 – Lindsay Jacob – North Melbourne
 1976 – Paul O'Donoghue – North Melbourne

The following footballers played senior VFL football prior to playing / coaching with Corowa FC, with the year indicating their first year at Corowa FC.

1924 - Rex De Garis - St. Kilda
1925 - Fred G Johnson - Carlton 
1928 - Albert Anderson - St. Kilda & Richmond
1930 - Bert Smedley - St. Kilda
1931 - Aubrey McKenzie - Footscray
1937 - Rupert Gibb - Richmond & Footscray
1947 - Stan Wright - Fitzroy
1948 - Laurie Taylor - Richmond
1949 - Bill King - South Melbourne
1950 - Tom Lahiff - Essendon, South Melbourne & Hawthorn 
1960 - Frank Tuck - Collingwood
1965 - John Hoiles - Footscray
1965 - Alby Dunn - South Melbourne
1968 - Fred Swift - Richmond
1978 - Norm Smith - Hawthorn

Club Best and Fairest recipients
The Reverend Father Bonnar's Gold Medal
1930 – Ray "Nana" Baker

The S C Janson Cup (Janson's Sports Store)
1935 – Tom Wells

The "Maples Medal", donated by Maples Furniture Store Ltd.
1937 – Ray Whinray
1938 – Frank Bell
1939 – A C "Possum" Yates
1940 – ?

Les Harper Cup (Harper's Empire Hotel),
Murray Valley Patriotic Football League,
Border United Football Club.
1944 – Peter Gale 
1945 – Peter Gale and Keith Williams (Tied)

Club honourboard

The club's honourboard displays every year from 1877 to 1978, including the years the club was known as either the Border United Football Club or the Corowa Football Club.
 1877 to 1905 – Border United FC
 1906 to 1913 – Corowa FC
 1914 to 1919 – Border United FC
 1920 to 1943 – Corowa FC
 1944 to 1947 – Border United FC
 1948 to 1978 – Corowa FC

Goalkickers: 
 – ? Means incomplete goals or no goal tallies in some match reviews in newspapers. 
 – * includes goals kicked in finals.
 - Ladder position is at the end of the home & away series of matches.

External links
 Rutherglen Football Club (1893)
 Rutherglen Football Club
 Corowa-Rutherglen Football Club
 1923 - Corowa FC team photo
 1932 - Corowa FC & East Albury FC team photos
 1934 - Corowa FC & Albury FC team photos
 1937 - Corowa FC & Wangaratta FC team photos
 1937 - Chiltern & District FL Premiers: Corowa Stars FC
 1939 - Corowa Rovers FC team photo
 1944 - Border United FC & Rutherglen FC team photos
 1947 - Border United FC team photo
 1950 - Corowa FC team photo
 1953 - Corowa FC team photo
 1963 - O&MFL Runners Up: Corowa FC team photo

References

Ovens & Murray Football League clubs
1979 disestablishments in Australia